Rudolf Trenkel (17 January 1918 – 26 April 2001) was a German Luftwaffe military aviator during World War II. As a flying ace, he was credited with 138 victories and was a recipient of Knight's Cross of the Iron Cross of Nazi Germany.

Career
Trenkel served in Jagdgeschwader 52 (JG 52—52nd Fighter Wing) during the Battle of Britain. From February to June 1942, he was assigned to Jagdgeschwader 77 (JG 77—77th Fighter Wing) only to be transferred back to JG 52 where he was assigned to 2. Staffel (2nd squadron). In 1944, he was forced to bail out five times within ten days. On 14 July 1944, Trenkel was credited with his 100th aerial victory. He was the 83rd Luftwaffe pilot to achieve the century mark.

Squadron leader
On 15 August 1944, Trenkel was appointed Staffelkapitän (squadron leader) of the recreated 2. Staffel of JG 52. The original 2. Staffel under the command of Oberleutnant Paul-Heinrich Dähne had been withdrawn from the Eastern Front and transferred west to fight in Defense of the Reich in early June 1944. There the Staffel was subordinated to III. Gruppe of Jagdgeschwader 11 (JG 11—11th Fighter Wing) and later became the 12. Staffel of JG 11. Trenkel formed the new 2. Staffel of JG 52 at Kraków from 15 to 26 August.

On 16 October 1944, JG 52 lost six aircraft in combat with the French Armée de l'Air Normandie-Niemen fighter regiment serving on the Eastern Front. One of the pilots shot down was Trenkel who survived by bailing out.

Trenkel and other soldiers of JG 52 surrendered to the 90th US Infantry Division near Písek on 8 May 1945 and became a prisoner of war (POW). The soldiers were initially interned at a POW camp at Strakonice where on 14 May, Trenkel married his fiancé Ida Sehnal who was among the civilian refuges. The wedding ceremony was held by Oberst Hermann Graf. The witnesses to the wedding were Major Adolf Borchers and Hauptmann Erich Hartmann. On 15 May, Trenkel and most of the JG 52 personnel were handed over by the American forces to the Soviet Union.

Summary of career

Aerial victory claims
According to US historian David T. Zabecki, Trenkel was credited with 138 aerial victories. Spick also lists Trenkel with 138 aerial victories claimed in over 500 combat missions, all but one on the Eastern Front. Mathews and Foreman, authors of Luftwaffe Aces — Biographies and Victory Claims, researched the German Federal Archives and found records for 138 aerial victory claims, plus three further unconfirmed claims. This figure includes 131 aerial victories on the Eastern Front and one Western Allies four-engined bomber.

Victory claims were logged to a map-reference (PQ = Planquadrat), for example "PQ 59191". These sectors were then subdivided into 36 smaller units to give a location area 3 × 4 km in size.

Awards
 Honour Goblet of the Luftwaffe on 1 February 1943 as Feldwebel and pilot
 German Cross in Gold on 15 January 1943 as Feldwebel in the 2./Jagdgeschwader 52
 Knight's Cross of the Iron Cross on 19 August 1943 as Oberfeldwebel and pilot in the 2./Jagdgeschwader 52

Notes

References

Citations

Bibliography

 
 
 
 
 
 
 
 
 
 
 
 
 
 
 

1918 births
2001 deaths
Luftwaffe pilots
German World War II flying aces
Recipients of the Gold German Cross
Recipients of the Knight's Cross of the Iron Cross
People from Harzgerode
Military personnel from Saxony-Anhalt